The secretary of state of Louisiana is one of the elected constitutional officers of the U.S. state of Louisiana and serves as the head of the Louisiana Department of State. The position was created by Article 4, Section 7 of the Louisiana Constitution.

The current secretary of state is Kyle Ardoin.

Structure and organization
The Secretary of State's Office is the core of the Louisiana Department of State, composed of eight divisions:

The Louisiana State Archives is a division of the secretary of state's office, and is the official repository for all historical records of the state.
The Commissions Division grants commission certificates to state officials, as well as justices of the peace and clergymen (to perform marriages).  This division also issues apostilles, and attests and affixes the state seal to pardons issued by the governor.
The Commercial Division registers corporations and other business entities, administers the state trademark laws, and files liens pursuant to the Uniform Commercial Code.  This division also serves as the registered agent for service of process in certain types of lawsuits.
The Elections Division is responsible for the administration of all elections within the state.  Campaign finance and lobbying are regulated by the Louisiana Ethics Administration, a separate agency.
The Museums Division operates the state's many museums and historical exhibits.
The Notaries Division licenses and supervises notaries public.
The Publications Division publishes the state laws of Louisiana, as well as other informational documents of the state government.
The Voter Outreach Division is responsible for educating and promoting voter rights to current and future voters by coordinating with schools, private organizations, and holding its own voter registration drives.

Other services
The secretary administers Louisiana's Address Confidentiality Program, which protects victims of stalking, domestic violence, and sexual abuse.
The secretary operates "Louisiana One Call", the state's "call before you dig" program, and accepts applications for the Southeast Louisiana Flood Protection Authority.

List of secretaries of state

See also
 Attorney General of Louisiana

References

External links
GeauxVote.com Official Voting Portal. Created to help voters remember address.

Secretaries of State of Louisiana
Secretary of state